The 170th Infantry Division (German: 170. Infanterie-Division) was a German division in World War II. It fought on the Eastern Front for much of the war.

Operational history
The division was formed on 1 December 1939.

The Division participated in the invasion of Denmark. 

The German plan and force:
The occupation of Denmark had been put into the hands of the XXI corps (General of the Infantry Nikolaus von Falkenhorst), which consisted of the 170th Infantry Division and 198th Infantry Division. 
For the occupation of Jutland the following forces were ready: The 170th Infantry Division under Major general Witte (391th, 399th, 401th Infantry Regiments and the 240th. Artillery Regiment), along with other units.

Commanding officers
Lieutenant General Walter Wittke, 1 December 1939 – 8 January 1942
Lieutenant General Erwin Sander, 8 January 1942 – 15 February 1943
Lieutenant General Walther Krause, 15 February 1943 – 15 February 1944
Major General Franz Griesbach, 15 February 1944 – 16 February 1944
Lieutenant General Siegfried Haß, 16 February 1944 – 8 May 1945

References

Infantry divisions of Germany during World War II
Military units and formations established in 1939
1939 establishments in Germany
Military units and formations disestablished in 1945